Little Sofia (Malka Sofia or Мала София, Mala Sofia; , Mikri Sofia) is a designation applied to localities outside the modern borders of Bulgaria; it is used in the late Ottoman era to emphasize the population's strong Bulgarian national identity. The term most often refers to villages in the region of Macedonia during the late Ottoman era and for a brief period after (particularly in Vardar Macedonia and Greek Macedonia).

Villages nicknamed Little Sofia
 Akir, Israel (for its Jewish Bulgarian population)
 Ano Vrontou (Горно Броди, Gorno Brodi), Serres regional unit, Greece.
 Dračevo (Драчево), Kisela Voda municipality, North Macedonia
 Lokvica (Локвица), Makedonski Brod municipality, North Macedonia
 Raotince (Раотинце), Jegunovce municipality, North Macedonia
 Vasileiada (Загоричани, Zagorichani), Kastoria regional unit, Greece
 Velgošti (Велгощи, Velgoshti), Ohrid municipality, North Macedonia
 Vevi (Баница, Banitsa), Florina regional unit, Greece
 Xino Nero (Екши Су, Ekshi Su), Florina regional unit, Greece
 Ydroussa (Долно Котори, Dolno Kotori), Florina regional unit, Greece

References

Modern history of Macedonia (region)
History of Sofia
Bulgarian communities